Nicon may refer to:
 The Roman architect Aeulius Nicon
 Tom Nicon (1988–2010), French fashion model
 A Byzantine missionary and saint (10th century) called as Saint Nikon the Metanoeite (i.e. the Repenter)
 Nicon (polychaete), genus of polychaete worms
 An ancient port in Southern Somalia, alternatively spelled as Nikon

See also
Nikon, a Japanese multinational corporation